County routes in Cayuga County, New York, are not signed in any form, serving as little more than references for inventory purposes. Route numbers below 114 generally increase progressively based on the alphabetical order of the towns where they are primarily located, beginning with Aurelius and ending with Victory (excluding Montezuma); however, several exceptions exist. Routes 114 through 116 are primarily in the town of Montezuma, while numbers above 121 do not follow any pattern.

Routes 1–50

Routes 51–100

Routes 101 and up

See also

County routes in New York

References

External links
Empire State Roads – Cayuga County Roads